R. W. Johnson (born 1943; Richard William, "Bill" ) is a British journalist, political scientist, and historian who lives in South Africa. Born in England, he was educated at Natal University and Oxford University, as a Rhodes Scholar. He was a fellow in politics at Magdalen College, Oxford, for 26 years and remains an emeritus fellow. His 2015 book Look Back in Laughter: Oxford's Postwar Golden Age is a memoir of his years at Magdalen, including his work with college president Keith Griffin to rescue the college's finances and buildings. In reviewing his memoirs, The Economist described Johnson as a "romantic contrarian liberal".

On his return to South Africa in 1995, he became director of the Helen Suzman Foundation in Johannesburg until 2001.

He has been a South Africa correspondent for the London Sunday Times and also written for the London Review of Books His articles for the LRB generally cover South African and, to a lesser extent, Zimbabwean affairs.

In early March 2009, Johnson injured his left foot while swimming. It became infected with necrotizing fasciitis and his leg was amputated above the knee.

Bibliography
 (ed. with Christopher Allen) African Perspectives (1970)
 How Long Will South Africa Survive? (1977)
 The Long March of the French Left (1981)
 Shootdown: The Verdict on KAL 007 (1985)
 Heroes and Villains: Selected Essays (1990)
 (ed. with Lawrence Schlemmer) Launching Democracy in South Africa: South Africa's First Open Election, April 1994 (1996)
 (ed. with David Welsh) Ironic Victory: Liberalism in Post-Liberation South Africa (1998)
 South Africa; The First Man, the Last Nation (2004)
 South Africa's Brave New World: The Beloved Country since the End of Apartheid (2009)
 How Long Will South Africa Survive?: The Looming Crisis (2015)
 Look Back in Laughter: Oxford's Postwar Golden Age (2015)

References

1943 births
Living people
South African non-fiction writers
University of Natal alumni
South African Rhodes Scholars
South African political scientists
Fellows of Magdalen College, Oxford
British emigrants to South Africa
South African amputees
Scientists with disabilities